The Belgian State Railways Type 7 (originally the Type 8 bis), later known as the NMBS/SNCB Type 7, was a class of  compound locomotives built between 1921 and 1924.

The class was used to work heavy passenger trains operated by the Belgian State Railways, and its successor, the National Railway Company of Belgium (NMBS/SNCB), which was established in 1926.

One member of the class, no. 7.039, has been preserved by the NMBS/SNCB for display at Train World, the Belgian national railway museum.

See also

History of rail transport in Belgium
List of SNCB/NMBS classes
Rail transport in Belgium

References

External links 

4-6-0 locomotives
National Railway Company of Belgium locomotives
Railway locomotives introduced in 1921
Steam locomotives of Belgium
Passenger locomotives
Standard gauge locomotives of Belgium